As of 2015, Tirukkural has been translated into Dutch only once.

History of translations
Selections of Tirukkural couplets were translated into the Dutch language by D. Kat in 1964. This is the only Dutch translation of the Kural text known thus far.

Translations

See also
 Tirukkural translations
 List of Tirukkural translations by language

References

External links
 

Dutch
Translations into Dutch